Blayney Townley-Balfour or Blayney Townley Balfour, born Blayney Townley (1705–1788) was member of the Irish House of Commons for Carlingford in 1760 and again from 1761 to 1776. He took the surname Balfour to inherit property in County Fermanagh from his nephew William Charles Balfour.

He died at his country house, Townley Hall, in County Louth. His son, also Blayney, predeceased him; his grandson, also Blayney Townley-Balfour, inherited his property.

References

Irish MPs 1727–1760
Irish MPs 1761–1768
Irish MPs 1769–1776
Politicians from County Meath
People from Carrickfergus
1705 births
1788 deaths
Members of the Parliament of Ireland (pre-1801) for County Louth constituencies